Peyssonneliales is a monotypic order of red algae belonging to the class Florideophyceae and the subclass Rhodymeniophycidae. It contains only 1 known family, Peyssonneliaceae .

The type species is Peyssonnelia

History
Genera Peyssonnelia and Sonderopelta were originally in order Gigartinales  but comparative morphology and rbcL and nuclear LSU rRNA sequence data showed that they were separate and therefore order Peyssonneliales was established in 2009 to hold them both.

Incendia was initially resolved as a monophyletic clade with full support for rbcL. Then using robust rbcL phylogeny, order Peyssonneliales was lso resolved as monophyletic with well-supported main lineages.

Description
Delineation of the various genera in the Peyssonneliaceae had mostly been based on vegetative characteristics.

Peyssonneliales order algae are red, crustose, prostrate, and usually epilithic (growing on the surfaces of rocks). The crusts may be non-calcified throughout, calcified throughout, or partially calcified (with hypobasal calcification (situated posterior to the basal wall) between the attachment rhizoids). Calcium carbonate, if present, is in the mineral form aragonite (James et al., 1988). The lower surfaces of the crusts are partially to completely attached to the sub-stratum, either directly (i.e., without rhizoids) or by unicellular or multi cellular rhizoids. Prostrate growth is by radiating marginal rows of transversely dividing apical initials in the basal layer (multi axial). These growths then later divide vertically to form a single upper or lower perithallial cell (surrounding the thallus). The first section of the perithallial cells gives rise to simple or branched filaments that together form a loose to compact upper- only cortex or upper and lower cortices. Cortical cells have numerous discoid or ribbon- like chloroplasts.

The red algae colour comes from photosynthetic pigments (phycoerythrin, phycocyanin, allophycocyanin). Then the various blends of relative amounts of these 3 and chlorophyll, influences the plant colour, which can vary from dark red to blue, brown, or greenish.

Genera
As accepted by AlgaeBase (with number of species per genera);
 
 Agissea  - 14 spp.
 Brasilophycus  - 2 spp.
 Chevaliericrusta  - 1 sp.
 Cruoriella  - 4 spp.
 Cruoriopsis  - 4 spp.
 Incendia  - 10 spp.
 Metapeyssonnelia  - 5 spp.
 Olokunia  - 5 spp.
 Peyssonnelia  - 68 spp.
 Piriora  - 1 sp.
 Polystrata  - 6 spp.
 Pulvinia  - 1 sp.
 Ramicrusta  - 19 spp.
 Rhodowynnea  - 3 spp.
 Riquetophycus  - 1 sp.
 Seiria  - 2 spp.
 Sonderophycus  - 4 spp.
 Squamaria  - 1 sp.

Former genera; Gymnosorus , Haematostagon , Lithymenia , Nardoa  and 
Sonderopelta 

WoRMS doesn't accept the genera; Agissea, Brasilophycus, Olokunia, Piriora, Rhodowynnea and Squamaria.
It also notes; Cruoriopsis is accepted as synonym of Peyssonnelia,
Haematostagon  is accepted as synonym of Peyssonnelia,
Lithymenia  is accepted as synonym of Peyssonnelia
Sonderopelta  is accepted as synonym of Sonderophycus.

Distribution
The order has cosmopolitan distribution, worldwide. They are found in places such as Brazil, western Atlantic Ocean, San Andres Island, (in the Caribbean Sea), Jamaica (also in the Caribbean Sea), Puerto Rico, Gulf of California (Pacific Ocean), Hawaii, Azores (Atlantic Ocean), Brittany in France, southern Australia, New Zealand, also parts of Asia (near Indonesia, Thailand, South Korea and China).

Members of Peyssonneliales can be found growing on hard substratum (bedrock), ref name="Krayesky"/> or found growing on corals.

Uses
Peyssonnelia has anti-viral abilities.

References

Other sources
 Ballantine, D. L., Lozada-Troche, C. & Ruíz, H. 2014. Metapeyssonnelia tangerina (Peyssonneliaceae, Rhodophyta), a new species associated with coral reef habitats in Puerto Rico, Caribbean Sea. Phycol. Res. 62:197-205.
 Ballantine, D. L. & Ruiz, H. 2005. Two Peyssonnelia species (Peyssonneliaceae, Rhodophyta) from Puerto Rico including Peyssonnelia flavescens sp. nov. Phycologia 44:328-34.
 Dixon, K.R. & Saunders, G.W., 2013. DNA barcoding and phylogenetics of Ramicrusta and Incendia gen. nov., two early diverging lineages of the Peyssonneliaceae (Rhodophyta). Phycologia 52: 82–108. https://doi.org/10.2216/12-62.1
 Sherwood, A.R., Paiano, M.O., Spalding, H.L. & Kosaki, R.K. 2020. Biodiversity of Hawaiian Peyssonneliales (Rhodophyta). 2. Sonderophycus copusii, a new species from the Northwestern Hawaiian Islands. ALGAE 35: 145–155. https://doi.org/10.4490/algae.2020.35.5.20

 
Red algae orders